Ruggero Franceschini, O.F.M. Cap (born 1 September 1939) is an Italian Catholic archbishop.

Biography
Ruggero Franceshini was born in Prignano sulla Secchia, Italy, on 1 September 1938. He entered the Order of Friars Minor Capuchin and took his vows in 1960. He was ordained a priest of that order on 11 August 1963.

On 2 July 1993, he was appointed apostolic vicar of Anatolia and titular bishop of Sicilibba, North Africa. He received his episcopal consecration on 3 October 1993 from Cardinal Achille Silvestrini, Prefect of the Congregation for the Oriental Churches.

On 11 October 2004, he was named Archbishop of Izmir. Shortly after arriving in Izmir, a police car that a deranged man had stolen struck him crossing the road. He spent months in the hospital and left him with a limp. He hired a Turkish lawyer and waited years for a resolution. He later connected it to other attacks he viewed as part of an anti-Christian campaign.

On 12 June 2010, he was given the additional responsibility of apostolic administrator of the Apostolic Vicariate of Anatolia following the murder of Bishop Luigi Padovese. He did not accept the official explanation that Padovese had been the victim of a single mentally disturbed man. He connected it to other attacks and called it the work of "ultranationalists and religious fanatics".

On 7 November 2015, Pope Francis accepted his resignation as archbishop and named Lorenzo Piretto to succeed him.

References

1939 births
Living people
Italian Roman Catholic archbishops
Capuchin bishops
21st-century Roman Catholic titular bishops
Religious leaders from the Province of Modena
20th-century Roman Catholic bishops in Turkey